literally means fifth street in Japanese.

Names 
 —a Japanese kuge family descended from the Sugawara clan
 Gojo Industries, an American soap company
 Gojo Takeshi, a character in Kodomo no Omocha
 A nickname for Mike Golic, Jr., an American radio personality
 , a character from the anime and manga series Jujutsu Kaisen

Places 
 Gojō, Nara, a city in Nara Prefecture, Japan
 , one of east–west streets in the ancient capital of Heian-kyō, present-day Kyoto
 Train stations:
 Gojō Station (Kyoto), a train station on the Kyoto Municipal Subway Karasuma Line in Shimogyō-ku, Kyoto
 Gojō Station (Nara), a train station JR West Wakayama Line in Gojō, Nara
[Gojo is an anime character]